Arlecdon is a village in the Borough of Copeland in Cumbria, England, near the town of Whitehaven.

Church
St Michael's Parish church is an historic Grade II listed church, which is located about halfway between the villages of Arlecdon and Asby. The church founded in the 12th or 13th century. The church was restored in 1776 and its nave was rebuilt in 1829. The church was extensively remodelled, and had its tower added from 1903 to 1905. However, the church retains its chancel arch of c. 1630, which incorporates parts of the original 12th-century arch. The church's octagonal font is dated 1578. The church contains a stained glass window dedicated to Isaac Fletcher of Frizington. In 1904 the church was remodelled, with the addition of a bell tower and eight bells cast by John Taylor & Son of Loughborough.

In 2014 it was announced that the church is to close, and the bells hopefully re-used in another church.

Village
The village also has a 19th-century primary school and an old Sunday school.

Etymology
'Arlecdon' is " OE 'earn-lāce denu', eagle-stream valley'."('OE' is Old English).

Notable people
 John Adams, 1st Baron Adams OBE, JP, MA (12 October 1890 – 23 August 1960). British politician and public servant. The son of Thomas Adams and Mary Bowness, he was raised to the peerage as Baron Adams on 16 February 1949, the first Cumberland-born man to be so honoured since 1797. He is buried by the foot of the church tower.
 Billy Adams, professional footballer

See also

Listed buildings in Arlecdon and Frizington

References

External links

  Cumbria County History Trust: Arlecdon (nb: provisional research only - see Talk page)

Villages in Cumbria
Borough of Copeland